Zhenhai Bridge was a large stone arch bridge in Tunxi District of Huangshan City, Anhui, China.

History
It is said that Zhenhai Bridge was built in the 15th year of Jiajing period (1536) in the Ming dynasty, but according to Xiuning County Annals and Huizhou Prefecture Chronicles, the bridge was built before 1490.  The bridge was rebuilt in 1699, during the Kangxi reign of Qing dynasty.  

In October 2019, it was authorized as a "Major Historical and Cultural Site Protected at the National Level in Anhui" by the State Council. 

On July 7, 2020, Zhenhai Bridge was destroyed in the 2020 China floods. During salvage works, stones of the original Ming dynasty bridge were found. In December 2020, reconstruction of the bridge commenced.

Gallery

References

Stone bridges in China
Arch bridges in China
Bridges in Anhui
Ming dynasty architecture
Qing dynasty architecture
Buildings and structures destroyed by flooding